Pitt River is a large tributary of the Fraser River in British Columbia, Canada.

Pitt River may also refer to:

Pitt River (New Zealand), a river in Fiordland, New Zealand
Pit River, or Pitt River in some spellings, a river in California, U.S.
Pit River Tribe, who live along the river
Pitt River Expedition, a number of expeditions named for the Pit River 
River Pitt, in Somerset, England

See also
Pitt-Rivers, an English surname
Pitt Rivers Museum, University of Oxford